Julie Thompson (born 14 April 1958) is a former American rugby union player. She represented the  when they won the inaugural 1991 Women's Rugby World Cup in Wales. Thompson and the 1991 World Cup squad were inducted into the United States Rugby Hall of Fame in 2017.

References 

Living people
1958 births
Female rugby union players
American female rugby union players
United States women's international rugby union players